Heimberg may refer to:

Places

In Germany 
Heimberg, Saxony-Anhalt, Saxony-Anhalt
Heimberg, Baden-Württemberg, in the municipality of Niederstetten, Baden-Württemberg
Heimberg (Deuerling), in the municipality of Regensburg, Bavaria
Heimberg (Fischach), in the municipality of Augsburg, Bavaria
Heimberg (Irschenberg), in the municipality of Miesbach, Bavaria
Heimberg (Oberbergkirchen), in the municipality of Mühldorf, Bavaria

In other countries
 Heimberg, Switzerland, in the Canton of Bern
 Heimberg, Austria, in Haag, Lower Austria

People with the surname
 Alex Heimberg, also known as Miss Understood, New York drag queen
 Lothar Heimberg, an early member of the band Scorpions
 Michelle Heimberg (born 2000), Swiss diver

German-language surnames